Bobea is a genus of flowering plants in the family Rubiaceae. All species in this genus are endemic to Hawaii. Bobea was named for Jean-Baptiste Bobe-Moreau by Charles Gaudichaud-Beaupré in 1830 in his book Voyage de l'Uranie.

The wood of Bobea is hard, wearable, and yellow. It was used for the gunwales of Polynesian voyaging canoes. The gunwales of modern canoes are sometimes painted yellow in imitation of the wood that is no longer widely available.

Species
 Bobea brevipes A.Gray – Ahakea lau lii (Kauai, Oahu)
 Bobea gaudichaudii (Cham.  & Schltdl.) H.St.John & Herbst – Ahakea lau nui (Kauai, Molokai, Maui, island of Hawaii)
 Bobea sandwicensis (A.Gray) Hillebr. – Ahakea (Oahu, Molokai, Lānai, Maui)
 Bobea timonioides (Hook.f.) Hillebr. – Ahakea (Maui, island of Hawaii)

References

External links

Bobea in the World Checklist of Rubiaceae

 
Rubiaceae genera
Endemic flora of Hawaii
Trees of Hawaii
Taxonomy articles created by Polbot